James V. Kern (September 22, 1909, New York City, New York – November 9, 1966, Encino, California) was an American singer, songwriter, screenwriter, actor, and director.

Educated at the Fordham Law School, Kern worked for a while as an attorney. He sang with the George Olsen Trio, and appeared with the Olsen orchestra in the musical Good News. From 1927 to 1939, he sang with and wrote for the Yacht Club Boys quartet, with whom he appeared in several motion pictures.

He became a screenwriter and later a director. In film, he directed mainly "B" pictures, but after he moved to television, he directed hundreds of series episodes. He was one of the house directors on I Love Lucy in the 1950s. He directed My Three Sons for most of two seasons in the 1960s.  When he died suddenly of a heart attack at age 57, several episodes of the show remained only partially completed for the 1966/67 season, so director James Sheldon was brought in by series producers to round out the season.

He joined ASCAP in 1955. His popular-song compositions include "Easy Street," "Lover, Lover," "Little Red Fox," and "Shut the Door."

Filmography

As director 
 1944: The Doughgirls
 1946: Never Say Goodbye
 1947: Stallion Road
 1948: April Showers
 1950: The Colgate Comedy Hour (television series)
 1950: The Jack Benny Program (television series)
 1950: The Second Woman
 1951: Two Tickets to Broadway
 1953: Topper (television series)
 1955: The Millionaire (television series)
 1956: Lum and Abner Abroad
 1956: The Gale Storm Show (television series)
 1956: I Love Lucy  (television series)
 1957: Date with the Angels (television series)
 1957: Maverick (television series)
 1958: The Ann Sothern Show (television series)
 1958: 77 Sunset Strip (television series)
 1958: The Donna Reed Show (television series)
 1960: Pete and Gladys (television series)
 1960: My Three Sons (television series)
 1961: The Joey Bishop Show (television series)
 1965: My Favorite Martian (television series)

As writer 
 1939: That's Right – You're Wrong
 1940: If I Had My Way
 1940: You'll Find Out
 1941: Look Who's Laughing
 1941: Playmates
 1943: Thank Your Lucky Stars
 1944: Shine On, Harvest Moon
 1944: The Doughgirls
 1945: The Horn Blows at Midnight
 1946: Never Say Goodbye

As actor 
 1935: Thanks a Million – Member, The Yacht Club Boys (uncredited)
 1936: The Singing Kid – Member – The Yacht Club Boys (uncredited)
 1936: Stage Struck – Member – The Yacht Club Boys (uncredited)
 1937: Artists & Models – Yacht Club Boys Member
 1937: Thrill of a Lifetime – Jimmie
 1938: Artists and Models Abroad – Member – The Yacht Club Boys (uncredited) (final film role)

As producer 
 1950: The Jack Benny Program (television series)
 1956: Lum and Abner Abroad

References

External links
 

1909 births
1966 deaths
American male film actors
American film directors
American male screenwriters
LGBT film directors
Singers from New York City
Fordham University School of Law alumni
20th-century American male actors
20th-century American singers
Screenwriters from New York (state)
20th-century American male singers
20th-century American male writers
20th-century American screenwriters
20th-century American LGBT people